Francesca Canepa (born 14 September 1971) is a former Italian female snowboarder, in 2010 she became sky runner and trail runner at the age of 40.

Biography
In skyrunning she achieved her best results at international level, winning three Skyrunner World Series races and breaking the final rankings of the 2017 Ultra category.

In snowboarding her best international result in FIS Snowboard World Cup was in the season 1997-98 with 8th place in parallel slalom of Sestrieres.

Selected results

Trail running/skyrunning
2012
 Lavaredo Ultra Trail
 Tor des Géants
 Ultra-Trail du Mont-Blanc

2013
 Ronda dels Cims (2013 Skyrunner World Series race)
 Eiger Ultra Trail
 Tor des Géants

2014
 Hong Kong 100
 Eiger Ultra Trail
 Transgrancanaria
 Lavaredo Ultra Trail

2015
 100 Miles of Istria
 Cappadocia Ultra Trail
 Eiger Ultra Trail

2016
 100 Miles of Istria
 Mozart 100

2017
 100 Miles of Istria
 Scenic Trail (2017 Skyrunner World Series race)
 Devil’s Ridge Ultra (2017 Skyrunner World Series race)
 Ultra des COURSIERES

2018
 Ultra-Trail du Mont-Blanc

See also
List of multi-sport athletes

References

External links
 
 Francesca Canepa profile at TrailRunning.it

1971 births
Living people
Italian sky runners
Italian female snowboarders
Trail runners
Sportspeople from Aosta Valley
Italian ultramarathon runners
Female ultramarathon runners
People from Courmayeur